P. nigricauda may refer to:
 Phaonia nigricauda, Malloch, 1918, a fly species in the genus Phaonia
 Pterocerina nigricauda, a picture-winged fly species

See also
 Nigricauda (disambiguation)